The Bocaraca is a steel roller coaster which is located at Parque de Diversiones Dr. Roberto Ortiz Brenes in San José, Costa Rica.

History and design
The Bocaraca is a standard production model, Vekoma Whirlwind, double corkscrew roller coaster, featuring a  lift hill, and a pair of corkscrews separated by a turn. It previously operated at Knoebels Amusement Resort in Pennsylvania from 1993 to 2004 as Whirlwind and before that, it opened at Playland in 1984, operating there until 1992 under the name Whirlwind as well.

The ride opened at Knoebels in 1993, replacing the Jet Star. The Whirlwind was removed after the 2004 season due to space constraints at Knoebels. After being removed, the ride was moved to Parque de Diversiones where it opened in 2005, and still operates there to this day. While at Knoebels and Playland, the coaster was the only Vekoma corkscrew coaster in the US to feature two separate corkscrew elements, as opposed to a double corkscrew.

References 

Roller coasters introduced in 1993